Archibald Woodbury McLelan  (20 December 1824  – 26 June 1890) was a Canadian shipbuilder and politician, the sixth Lieutenant Governor of Nova Scotia.

McLelan was born in Londonderry, Nova Scotia, the son of member of the Nova Scotia House of Assembly member Gloud Wilson McLelan.  Archibald McLelan was educated in Great Village and joined his father's shipping and retail business.  On his father's death in 1858 he succeeded him in the House of Assembly.

Strongly opposed to confederation with Canada, McLelan was elected as the first federal member of parliament for Colchester as an Anti-Confederate.

He reconciled himself to Confederation and was summoned to the Senate of Canada in 1869 where he sat as a Liberal-Conservative.

He resigned from the Upper House to run again for the House of Commons of Canada in an 1881 by-election and was returned to parliament as a Conservative.

McLelan served from 10 December 1885–26 January 1887 as the Minister of Finance in the second administration of Sir John A. Macdonald.

In 1842, he married Caroline Metzler. McLelan died in Halifax at the age of 65.

Electoral record

References 
 
 

1824 births
1890 deaths
Anti-Confederation Party MPs
Canadian Ministers of Finance
Canadian people of Ulster-Scottish descent
Canadian senators from Nova Scotia
Canadian shipbuilders
Conservative Party of Canada (1867–1942) MPs
Conservative Party of Canada (1867–1942) senators
Lieutenant Governors of Nova Scotia
Members of the House of Commons of Canada from Nova Scotia
Members of the King's Privy Council for Canada
People from Colchester County
Postmasters General of Canada
Nova Scotia pre-Confederation MLAs